Interstate 73 (I-73) is a proposed Interstate Highway in the US state of South Carolina. When completed, it will connect the Grand Strand area with the state's Interstate system.

History
In the 1980s, Ashby Ward of the Myrtle Beach Area Chamber of Commerce suggested that Representative John Light Napier ask the federal government to study an Interstate Highway to Myrtle Beach. Napier, who knew traffic was already a problem in the area, persuaded President Ronald Reagan to provide funding for studies.

Authorized by the Intermodal Surface Transportation Efficiency Act of 1991 (ISTEA), I-73 was established as a north–south high-priority corridor from Charleston, South Carolina, to Detroit, Michigan.

When I-73 crossed a border between two states, the federal law authorizing the road required that the two states agree that their sections meet. Originally, both Carolinas selected a route running south from Rockingham, North Carolina. However, North Carolina had more money to spend on roads, and, on May 10, 1995, the US Senate Environment and Public Works Committee approved North Carolina's plan for I-73 to run eastward to the coast and enter South Carolina at North Myrtle Beach. Later that year, officials in both states agreed that I-73 would enter South Carolina south of Rockingham and that the other highway would be I-74. This raised the possibility of I-73 bypassing the Myrtle Beach area entirely since I-74 would run to the Myrtle Beach area.

In May 1997, signs went up declaring the "Future Corridor" in Bennettsville, Marion, Conway, and Charleston. At this point, the highway was expected to run ,  of which were already four lanes. The route included US 1, SC 9, SC 38, and US 501, with a planned Conway bypass connecting to US 701, along which the highway would connect with US 17 on the way to Charleston.

At one point, South Carolina intended to have stop lights and driveways on I-73, but the National Highway System Designation Act, passed in 1995, required I-73 to be built to Interstate standards. Residents of McClellanville on US 17 protested, and alternative routes would bypass Georgetown, leading to the possibility of Myrtle Beach also being bypassed. People in Georgetown, wanting the highway to serve their port, asked that I-73 end in their community, but federal law still said Charleston would be the terminus.

In 1998, Representative Mark Sanford introduced an amendment to the Transportation Equity Act for the 21st Century (TEA-21) that changed the southern terminus of I-73 to Georgetown. However, the section between Myrtle Beach and Georgetown would not be part of I-73; instead, it would be a "high-priority corridor" along US 701. That same year, the South Carolina Department of Transportation (SCDOT) Commission endorsed a plan that would link I-73 from Georgetown through Conway, Marion, Bennettsville, and Wallace, to the North Carolina state line. In February, 2002, the South Carolina government changed the southern terminus from Georgetown to Briarcliffe Acres (the eastern terminus of SC 22).

In 2003, SCDOT went through a series of public meetings and came up with five routes:
 New construction parallel to SC 9.
 Convert SC 22 and create new construction parallel north of US 501 and SC 38.
 Convert SC 22, US 501, and SC 38.
 New construction parallel south of SC 22, US 501, and SC 38.
 Convert SC 22, US 501, SC 576, US 76/US 301, and SC 327 and build new construction toward Bennettsville.

In late 2003, the state decided to go with option three and started environmental impact studies in 2004. In February, 2005, North and South Carolina made an agreement on the location of I-73's state crossing, which will parallel east of SC 38. Part of the agreement was that SCDOT would develop and construct the short section into North Carolina, while the North Carolina Department of Transportation (NCDOT) would construct a connector route to the Carolina Bays Parkway from North Carolina. By the end of 2006, what originally was planned to be "option three" became "option two" after a series of public meetings and completion of the impact studies; this was confirmed in 2007 with the northern half of I-73 (from I-95 to the North Carolina state line).

On May 30, 2006, SCDOT announced its preferred routing of I-73 between Myrtle Beach and I-95. I-73 will begin where SC 22 starts at US 17 near Briarcliffe Acres. It will then proceed northwest, crossing the proposed routing of I-74 (currently SC 31, the Carolina Bays Parkway). I-73 will then use an upgraded SC 917 to cross the Little Pee Dee River. It will then proceed on a new freeway alignment between SC 917 and I-95 that would have an interchange with US 76 west of Mullins and then would proceed northwest to an exit with US 501 near Latta, passing that city to the south before intersecting I-95 near SC 38.

In February 2008, the record of decision (ROD) for the final environmental impact statement (EIS) for the section of I-73 from I-95 to SC 22 was signed. An October 22, 2008, ceremony marked the signing of the ROD for the section from the North Carolina state line to I-95.

In February 2010, the federal government announced the state would receive $10 million (equivalent to $ in ). On April 21, 2011, SCDOT voted to spend $105 million (equivalent to $ in ) on the interchange, which was expected to cost $150 million (equivalent to $ in ), including a  section of I-73. Supporters called it "The Interchange of Hope", while opponents called it "The Interchange to Nowhere". On September 15, 2011, South Carolina road commissioners approved an $11.5-million (equivalent to $ in ) plan to rebuild a bridge in Dillon County, near Latta.

On November 7, 2011, Myrtle Beach city council member Wayne Gray asked area elected officials to consider using Road Improvement and Development Effort (RIDE) funds to pay for a portion of I-73.

In June 2012, Miley and Associates of Columbia recommended improvements to SC 38 and US 501 to create the Grand Strand Expressway (GSX), a position long held by the Coastal Conservation League, which asked for the study. South Carolina Representative Alan D. Clemmons, head of the National I-73 Corridor Association, said such a plan had been considered but was not likely. Nancy Cave of the Coastal Conservation League reiterated support for upgrading SC 38 and US 501, along with US 521 and SC 9, after results of a new study were presented at an August 1, 2012, meeting of the Myrtle Beach Area Chamber of Commerce. The study claimed that 90,000 people could leave the area 10 hours faster in an evacuation with I-73 and Southern Evacuation Lifeline (SELL) both in place.

On June 20, 2017, Representative for South Carolina's 7th congressional district Tom Rice announced the Army Corps of Engineers issued a permit allowing for the construction of South Carolina's portion of I-73 from the North Carolina state line to Myrtle Beach. After the announcement, SCDOT's Transportation Commission chairperson Woody Willard of Spartanburg said "I-73 is important for economic development and safety, as a quicker way to evacuate people from the Grand Strand when a hurricane approaches. But the commission will not designate any state money toward the project unless the Legislature passes a law requiring it."

Interest in I-73 was renewed in early 2021 due in part to the announcement of the American Jobs Plan.

Future
The "I-73 Intermediate Traffic and Revenue Study" by C&M Associates, dated February 2016, was to be presented to state transportation officials March 24, 2016. It included upgrades to SC 22. RIDE III, if approved by voters, would also provide funding for SELL. After Hurricane Florence, however, SC 22 was flooded, and, while Representative Tom Rice proposed raising the road, engineers said such a project was too expensive for an event unlikely to happen again.

Exit list
The exit list is following the SCDOT preferred corridor and is subject to change.

See also

 Intracoastal Waterway
 Pee Dee River

References

External links

Map of Northern Corridor Selected Alternative
Map of Southern Corridor Selected Alternative

73
73
 South Carolina